T.V. Sky is the third album by the industrial band The Young Gods, released on 7 February 1992 through PIAS Recordings.

Critical reception

Accolades

Track listing

Chart performance

Personnel 

The Young Gods
Urs Hiestand – drums
Alain Monod – keyboards
Franz Treichler – vocals

Additional musicians and production
Erwin Autique – engineering
Roli Mosimann – production

References 

The Young Gods albums
Albums produced by Roli Mosimann
1992 albums